Aleksandr Yudaevich Gorelik (9 August 1945 – 27 September 2012) was a Soviet pair skater. He competed with Tatiana Zhuk. They are the 1965 World bronze medalists and the 1966 and 1968 World silver medalists. At the European Figure Skating Championships, they won the bronze medal in 1965 and the silver in 1966.  They won the silver medal at the 1968 Winter Olympics.

Personal life and career
Gorelik is Jewish. Earlier in his career, he competed with Tatiana Sharanova. They placed 7th at the 1964 European Championships. They were the first in the world pair with a great difference in height. Earlier in his career, he competed with Tatiana Sharanova. They placed 7th at the 1964 European Championships. They were the first in the world pair with a great difference in height.

His competitive career ended in 1969 when Zhuk became pregnant. She and her husband Albert Shesternyov decided to keep the baby and retire from competitive skating. Gorelik did not want to look for a new partner and start skating over again. After trying without success to train with Irina Rodnina, he also retired. Gorelik worked as a figure skating commentator on radio and was invited to play the main role (Sergei Berestov) in 1969 movie about figure skating Goluboi led.

He performed at circus on ice shows with Tatiana Zhuk and later worked as a coach. He was a figure skating commentator for Russia TV for a time.

Results

With Sharanova

With Zhuk

See also
List of select Jewish figure skaters

References

 Skatabase: 1960s Europeans
 Skatabase: 1960s Worlds

External links
Jews in Sports bio
IMDB bio

1945 births
2012 deaths
Figure skaters from Moscow
Russian Jews
Figure skaters at the 1968 Winter Olympics
Olympic figure skaters of the Soviet Union
Olympic silver medalists for the Soviet Union
Soviet male pair skaters
Olympic medalists in figure skating
World Figure Skating Championships medalists
European Figure Skating Championships medalists
Medalists at the 1968 Winter Olympics